Big Brother 5, also known as Big Brother: 100% натурален (lit. 100% Natural) was the fifth season of the Bulgarian reality television series Big Brother, and the fifteenth season of the format overall. The series launched on Nova Television on 17 August 2015, seven years after the last regular season of the format since Big Brother 4.

The promo for the new season began airing on Nova Television on 2 June 2015. The show commenced on August 17, 2015. Niki Kanchev and Aleksandra Sarchadjieva returned as main presenters.

Lasted for 26 Days, it was the shortest season of the format in Bulgaria (including celebrity and all-stars editions), as well as the shortest regular season ever produced as part of the Big Brother franchise around the world. Nikita Jönsson won with Kiril Simeonov as the runner-up.

Production

Format
The season was confirmed 2 June 2015 when Nova TV announced opening of the auditions for new Housemates.

Although Big Brother Family was initially announced as Big Brother 5 back in 2009, this was considered as the fifth regular season of the series in Bulgaria.

Teasers
On 25 May 2015 during the season finale of Your Face Sounds Familiar, a short promo with the sound theme and the Big Brother 2 eye aired, hinting that a new season was announced. The teaser was aired through the whole week until 2 June when Nova TV officially announced the return of the show.

Housemates
11 Housemates entered the House on Day 1. They were joined by 2 other Housemates on Day 2.

Adelina 
Adelina Banakieva-Ivanova "Adi" is from Sofia. She entered the House on Day 2. and was the fifth evicted on Day 24.

Anita 
Anita Bolyarova is from Pleven. She entered the House on Day 1 and finished fourth in the finale on Day 26.

Boris 
Boris Bratuhchev is from Burgas. He entered the House on Day 1 and was the third evicted on Day 15.

Ekaterina 
Ekaterina Balabanova "Katya" is from Sofia. She entered the House on Day 1 and finished fifth in the finale on Day 26.

Irena 
Irena Petrova is from Lukovit. She entered the House on Day 1 and was ejected on Day 17, after a fight with Silvia.

Kiril 
Kiril Simeonov is from Varna. He entered the House on Day 1 and finished second in the finale on Day 26.

Kristian 
Kristian Stoykov is from Pleven. He entered the House on Day 1 and was the first evicted on Day 8.

Nikita 
Nikita Jönsson is from Sofia but lives in Sweden for over 20 years. She entered the House on Day 1 and became a winner on Day 26.

Nikolina 
Nikolina Markova is from Varna. She entered the House on Day 2 and was the fourth evicted on Day 22.

Plamen B.  
Plamen Bogdanov is from Pazardjik. He entered the House on Day 1 and finished third in the finale on Day 26.

Plamen D.  
Plamen Dimitrov is from Sofia. He entered the House on Day 1. From Day 15 to Day 19 he was hospitalized, because he had an injury during a mission in the House. The doctors advised him to have a rest, so Plamen D. walked on Day 19.

Silvia 
Silvia Yurukova is from Gabrovo. She entered the House on Day 1 and was ejected on Day 17, after a fight with Irena.

Tsvetelin 
Tsvetelin Nikolov is from Sofia. He entered the House on Day 1 and was the second evicted on Day 15.

Nominations table

Notes 

 : Kristian was declared the Big Boss of the house, and his nominations (Boris and Kiril) were automatically nominated.
 : During a mission, Plamen D. had a serious injury and he was removed from being evicted.
 : After the second eliminations, Silvia and Irena had a fight in the House. Because of this, Big Brother ejected them on Day 17.
 : Plamen D. wasn't in the house, because he was still in the hospital for a third day. Despite his good condition, Plamen D. had to stay in the hospital for more treatment.

References

External links
 Official website

2015 Bulgarian television seasons
 5
2015 Bulgarian television series endings